Italy competed at the 1980 Winter Paralympics in Geilo, Norway. One competitor from Italy competed in two events in alpine skiing. He did not win any medals and Italy finished last in the medal table.

Alpine skiing 

Maurizio Cagol competed in the Men's Giant Slalom 1A and Men's Slalom 1A events. In the Giant Slalom 1A event he finished in 32nd place and in the Slalom 1A event he finished in 22nd place.

See also 

 Italy at the Paralympics
 Italy at the 1980 Winter Olympics

References 

1980
1980 in Italian sport
Nations at the 1980 Winter Paralympics